HMS Talbot was a 28-gun  sixth-rate frigate built for the Royal Navy during the 1820s.

Description
The ship's tonnage was 500  tons burthen. The Atholl class was armed with twenty 32-pounder carronades on her gundeck, six 32-pounder carronades on her quarterdeck and a pair of 9-pounder cannon in the forecastle. The ships had a crew of 175 officers and ratings.

Construction and career
Talbot, the fourth ship of her name to serve in the Royal Navy, was ordered on 30 April 1818, laid down in March 1821 at Pembroke Dockyard, Wales, and launched on 9 October 1824. She was completed on 21 December 1824 at Plymouth Dockyard and commissioned on 21 September of that year.

She was a participant at the Battle of Navarino on 20 October 1827.

She took part in Inglefield's 1854 Arctic expedition as a depot ship.

As a powder magazine off Beckton she overlooked the disastrous sinking of SS Princess Alice, a collision on the Thames on 14 September 1878.

Notes

References

External links
 

 

1824 ships
Ships built in Pembroke Dock